Tess Danesi is an American sex educator, blogger, and writer of BDSM erotica who conducts workshops, courses, and events. She writes for the American erotica anthology market, has contributed to Time Out New York, and has been featured in Fleshbot, a sex-oriented weblog, founded by Gawker Media.

Books

Contributor 
 Fast Girls: Erotica for Women, Cleis Press, 2010, 
 Surrender: Erotic Tales of Female Pleasure and Submission, Cleis Press, 2011, 
 Bottoms Up: Spanking Good Stories, Cleis Press, 2011, 
 Do Not Disturb: Hotel Sex Stories, Cleis Press, 2009, 
 Please, Sir: Erotic Stories of Female Submission, Cleis Press, 2010, 
 Pleasure Bound: True Bondage Stories, Cleis Press, 2009,

Digital releases 
 Momentum: Making Waves in Sexuality Feminism and Relationships

References

External links 
 Tess Danesi's Main Site

BDSM writers
Living people
American bloggers
Year of birth missing (living people)
21st-century American women writers
American women bloggers